Ahmed El Sheikh (born 12 June 1990) is an Egyptian footballer who plays for Ghazl El Mahalla SC as an attacking midfielder.

References

1990 births
Living people
People from Tanta
Egyptian footballers
Egyptian Premier League players
Association football midfielders
Tanta SC players
Al Ittihad Alexandria Club players
Tala'ea El Gaish SC players
Haras El Hodoud SC players
FC Masr players